Parmelinella is a genus of lichen belonging to the family  Parmeliaceae. The genus was circumscribed in 1987 by John Elix and Mason Hale as a segregate of Parmelina, from which it differs in having larger ascospores and containing salazinic acid. Although the genus had been assumed to be well-defined morphologically, a 2021 molecular phylogenetic study suggests that the generic delimitations need to be revised.

Species
Parmelinella afrocetrata 
Parmelinella chozoubae  – Asia
Parmelinella cinerascens  – South America
Parmelinella inexplicabilis 
Parmelinella manipurensis 
Parmelinella mutata  – South America
Parmelinella nimandairana  – Africa; Asia
Parmelinella salacinifera  – North America; Central America; South America; Caribbean islands; Thailand
Parmelinella schimperiana  – Kenya
Parmelinella simplicior  – Africa; Asia
Parmelinella versiformis  – South America
Parmelinella wallichiana  – Africa; Asia; Australia; South America

References

Parmeliaceae
Lecanorales genera
Lichen genera
Taxa named by Mason Hale
Taxa named by John Alan Elix
Taxa described in 1987